Dutch Uncles are an English indie pop band from Marple, England. They are known for their use of atypical time signatures within a pop context, and the androgynous vocals of frontman Duncan Wallis.

Biography
Originally from Marple, the band started playing together in college. 
Early influences included Talking Heads, XTC, The Smiths, Field Music, Tears for Fears, King Crimson, Kate Bush and Steve Reich. Originally known as Headlines, they became Dutch Uncles in April 2008, and in early 2009 released their self-titled debut album in Germany with Tapete Records, recorded at Cloud Hill Studios in Hamburg. Reviewing the album, New Musical Express commented that "their scratchy post-punk racket effectively draws a line between the first Futureheads album and Vampire Weekend. On the likes of "I Owe Someone For Everything" frontman Duncan Paton’s (sic) idiosyncratic yelping can be a bit annoying, but when they stop trying too hard, as on "Twelfth", the results are quite pleasing." 

The band emerged as part of a new wave of Manchester-area bands. (Duncan Wallis: "We all sort of came to light at the same time thanks to our manager’s EP that he’d released on his Love & Disaster label featuring us, Delphic, and Everything Everything, and I think that back in 2010 it was very important to say “Manchester isn’t just lad rock,” because it was shortly after the demise of Oasis and it feels very different now.") The band toured with dananananaykroyd, Bombay Bicycle Club and The Futureheads in 2009 and 2010 and released their UK debut single "The Ink", through independent record label Love & Disaster on 31 May 2010. Soon after, they signed to London label Memphis Industries and released the single "Fragrant" on 1 November 2010. Dutch Uncles' second album, Cadenza, was released on 25 April 2011. They toured the UK throughout 2011 including appearances at Reading and Leeds Festivals and stage headline slots at Bestival and Latitude, followed by a European and UK support tour with Wild Beasts.

Their third album, Out of Touch In The Wild, was released on 14 January 2013. The band consciously expanded their sonic palette for this release, with Robin Richards later admitting to having composed more under the influence of Stravinsky and stating that "I didn't want any boundaries when it came to writing the new songs. With Cadenza, I was always writing music with the idea of us playing it live with two guitars, drums and bass and maybe some piano. With this album, I wrote whatever felt right for any other instruments, be it strings or tube percussion." Wallis revealed that the underlying theme of the record was addiction and addictive behaviour. "For the song "Nometo", I tried to imagine Leonard Cohen doing his thing - full of regret - then I started to think about the idea of addiction, and then it seemed that every song contained a person who was addicted to something or another. The next two songs that were written – "Threads" and "Flexxin" – were about auto-erotic asphyxiation and S&M, and people becoming addicted to those types of things."

The following summer the band supported American rock band Paramore on their European tour. Paramore guitarist Taylor York cited Dutch Uncles as an inspiration for their 2013 album.

The band released their fourth album, O Shudder, on 23 February 2015. This record took a more personal and mature turn in terms of content, with reflections on sexuality, employment and considerations of parenthood. Duncan Wallis noted that "I’d just be writing in my flat at home, looking at the woodchip wallpaper, and I’d repeatedly say to myself, ‘Don’t make it personal, don’t make it personal, don’t make it personal.’ But it couldn’t be stopped; it was always going to sound like an album about a character settling into domestic life. We’d all been in long-term relationships at that point, and we were all kind of settling down." He also referred to having wanted Dutch Uncles " to sound like a more mature band... to have more of a knowingness" and even to sound more like "Grace Jones backed by Talking Heads" as well as describing the album as "an exploration into all different areas of doubt." 

Following the release of the album, guitarist Daniel Spedding left the band, leaving them a four-piece. Adding keyboard player Henry Broadhead and guitarist Neil Wright to the live band, Dutch Uncles played their biggest headline shows to date at the Koko in London and The Ritz in Manchester in spring 2015. In autumn 2015, the band supported Garbage on the European leg of their 20 Years Queer anniversary tour.

In February 2017, the band released their fifth album, Big Balloon.. Written and recorded as a reaction to its predecessor, the band developed the album with the intention of "simplifying the process" and of including more political content, although conversely also admitting to having worked under progressive rock influences including Gentle Giant, Focus and early King Crimson. The release coincided with a 12-date UK tour and an appearance at the BBC Radio 6 Music Festival. They made their first appearance at the Glastonbury Festival in June 2017.

In late 2022, the band announced that their sixth album, True Entertainment, would be released in early 2023.

Members
Pete Broadhead – Guitar, marimba (2008–present)
Andy Proudfoot – Drums (2008–present)
Robin Richards – Bass guitar (2008–present)
Duncan Wallis – Lead vocals, piano (2008–present)

Touring members
Henry Broadhead – Synthesisers, percussion (2015–present)
Neil Wright – Guitar (2015–present)

Former members
Daniel Spedding – Guitar (2008–2015)

Discography

Studio albums

EPs

Singles

References

External links
 Official website
 Myspace Profile
 Memphis Industries Profile
 Tapete Records Profile

English pop music groups
British indie rock groups
Musical groups established in 2008
Tapete Records artists
Memphis Industries artists